Future Music Festival Asia, often abbreviated as FMFA, was an annual music festival featuring local and international artists held in Kuala Lumpur, Malaysia. The festival was a franchise of Future Entertainment's successful Future Music Festival that has been running in Australia since 2006. Future Music Festival Asia was inaugurated in 2012, and has been headlined by notable acts such as The Temper Trap, Chemical Brothers, Flo Rida, The Prodigy, Psy and Fun.

FMFA 2012 

The festival began in 2012 as a one-day music festival at the Sepang International Circuit, featuring a mix of local and international acts. The inaugural event was officiated by Dato' Sri Dr. Ng Yen Yen, Malaysia's Tourism Minister at that time. The festival claimed to have seen an attendance of over 20,000 people from Malaysia and across the region.

FMFA 2013 

Future Music Festival Asia returned in 2013 with a two-day festival which featured prominent trance DJ Armin van Buuren's A State of Trance 600 on Day One, followed by a second day of local and international live music acts. Headliners included major trance acts on Day One such as Armin van Buuren, W&W, and Cosmic Gate, while Day Two saw PSY, The Prodigy, Rita Ora, Fun., The Temper Trap, and Rudimental, among others. Future Music Festival Asia 2013 was reported to have attracted more than 55,000 fans over the two-day festival.

Reception towards the festival have been largely positive, but there have been numerous complains about the venue's traffic problems and the lack of public transportation.

FMFA 2014 
The organizers of Future Music Festival Asia announced in 2013 that the next installment of the festival will be a three-day event, taking place from 13–15 March 2014. Mines Resort City was initially announced as the venue, but it had been changed to the car park of the Bukit Jalil National Stadium. The festival expected to draw a total crowd of more than 75,000 festival goers over three days, and over 20,000 tourists.

The festival was slated to cover a span of three days: the Future Music Festival 2014 Opening Party featuring controversial Canadian DJ Deadmau5 on 13 March 2014, A State of Trance 650 with Armin van Buuren on 14 March 2014, and the main safari-themed event featuring Pharrell Williams, Macklemore & Ryan Lewis, and many other artists on 15 March 2014. Kuala Lumpur is the only location other than Miami where A State of Trance has returned to for the second time. Six drug-related deaths were reported in association with Day 2 of the festival, which resulted in the cancellation of Day 3 as instructed by local authorities. More than a year later, it was confirmed via post-mortem results issued two months after the incident showed that the cause of deaths were due to heatstroke, with drugs playing a negligible role. Yet, the authorities did not make the results known

Artist lineups

2012 International Line-up
Chemical Brothers
Flo Rida 
Tinie Tempah
Chase & Status (live)
The Wombats
Pendulum
Grandmaster Flash
Sneaky Sound System
Cosmic Gate
Eddie Halliwell
John 00 Fleming
Hercules & Love Affair
The Juan Maclean
Alex Metric
Azari & III
The Potbelleez
Kid Sister
Holy Ghost!
 Super 8 & Tab
Ruby Rose
The Stafford Brothers
 Andy Murphy
Timmy Trumpet

2013 International Line-up 

Armin Van Buuren
Aly & Fila
Ben Gold
Cosmic Gate
Super8 & Tab
W&W
The Prodigy
PSY
Rita Ora
Fun.
Bloc Party
The Temper Trap
Rudimental
DJ Fresh
Stafford Brothers
Timmy Trumpet
Tenzin
Feed Me
Kill The Noise
Zeds Dead
Naughty by Nature
De La Soul
Sidney Samson
Angger Dimas
Ladytron
Andy Moor
Idiotape (South Korea)
Shut Da Mouth (South Korea)
Sixteen (Indonesia)
DJ Stas (Singapore)
DJ Bento (Japan)

2014 Full Line-up 

Pharrell Williams
Martin Garrix
Marlo
 DJ Tosh Irama
 Bassjackers
 DJ Rosh
 Will Sparks
Andrew Rayel
Omnia
Tenzin
Rosh
 KOPIGO
 Sound Love Affair
Deadmau5
Macklemore & Ryan Lewis
 Axel Groove
Wu-Tang Clan Ft. Method Man, Ghostface Killah & Raekwon
Knife Party
Gesaffelstein
Rudimental
Chase and Status
Naughty Boy
Sub Focus
Tinie Tempah
Porter Robinson
Eric Prydz
Paul van Dyk
ATB
Adventure Club Ft. YUNA
Arty
Baauer
 Brodinski
Carnage
 Marcus Schulz
 Monsta
 R3hab
Deniz Koyu

See also 

 Future Entertainment
 Summadayze
 Good Life Festival
List of electronic music festivals

References

External links 

 Future Entertainment 

Music festivals established in 2012
Hip hop music festivals
Recurring events established in 2006
Electronic music festivals in Malaysia